Kevin Martin (25 December 1925 – 23 November 1983) was an Irish boxer. He competed at the 1948 Summer Olympics and the 1952 Summer Olympics. He died in Sydney, Australia.

References

1925 births
1983 deaths
Irish male boxers
Olympic boxers of Ireland
Boxers at the 1948 Summer Olympics
Boxers at the 1952 Summer Olympics
Place of birth missing
Featherweight boxers